Xylopia pierrei is a tree species in the family Annonaceae and its native range is Thailand to southern Vietnam.

References

pierrei
Flora of Cambodia
Flora of Vietnam
Vulnerable flora of Asia
Taxonomy articles created by Polbot